Ajuda United is a Guinea-Bissauan football club based in Bissau. They play in the 2nd division in Guinean football, the Campeonato Nacional da Guine-Bissau.

Current squad

Ajuda United